Cy Chadwick (born 2 June 1969) is an English former actor, director, producer, and presenter.  His most notable acting role was of Nick Bates in 720 episodes of the long-running British soap Emmerdale Farm from 1985 to 1996 and 1999.

A year after leaving the series, Leeds-born Chadwick rejoined ITV Yorkshire as a director.  As a freelance television producer, Chadwick co-founded the production company "ATypical Media".  He works for BBC Entertainment and directed and produced the Young Professionals of the Year series for BBC Three.

Chadwick also produced the Walking with..., Yorkshire Walks, Winter Walks and The Walk That Made Me programmes for the BBC.

References

External links
 

English male soap opera actors
English television producers
English television presenters
Male actors from Leeds
1969 births
Living people